Education in the Indian subcontinent began with teaching of traditional elements such as Indian religions, Indian mathematics, Indian logic at early Hindu and Buddhist centres of learning such as ancient Takshashila (in modern-day Pakistan) and Nalanda (in India). Islamic education became ingrained with the establishment of Islamic empires in the Indian subcontinent in the Middle Ages while the coming of the Europeans later brought western education to colonial India.

Several Western-style universities were established during the period of British rule in the 19th century. A series of measures continuing throughout the early half of the 20th century ultimately laid the foundation of the educational system of the Republic of India, Pakistan and much of the Indian subcontinent.

Early history

Early education in India commenced under the supervision of a guru or prabhu. Initially, education was open to all and seen as one of the methods to achieve Moksha in those days, or enlightenment. As time progressed, due to a decentralised social structure, the education was imparted on the basis of varna and the related duties that one had to perform as a member of a specific caste. The Brahmans learned about scriptures and religion while the Kshatriya were educated in the various aspects of warfare. The Vaishya caste learned commerce and other specific vocational courses. The other caste Shudras, were men of working class and they were trained on skills to carry out these jobs. The earliest venues of education in India were often secluded from the main population. Students were expected to follow strict monastic guidelines prescribed by the guru and stay away from cities in ashrams. However, as population increased under the Gupta empire centres of urban learning became increasingly common and Cities such as Varanasi and the Buddhist centre at Nalanda became increasingly visible.

Education in India is a piece of education traditional form was closely related to religion. Among the Heterodox schools of belief were the Jain and Buddhist schools. Heterodox Buddhist education was more inclusive and aside of the monastic orders the Buddhist education centres were urban institutes of learning such as Taxila and Nalanda where grammar, medicine, philosophy, logic, metaphysics, arts and crafts etc. were also taught. Early Buddhist institutions of higher learning like Taxila and Nalanda continued to function well into the common era and were attended by students from China and Central Asia.

On the subject of education for the nobility Joseph Prabhu writes: "Outside the religious framework, kings and princes were educated in the arts and sciences related to government: politics (danda-nıti), economics (vartta), philosophy (anvıksiki), and historical traditions (itihasa). Here the authoritative source was Kautilya’s Arthashastra, often compared to Niccolò Machiavelli’s The Prince for its worldly outlook and political scheming." The Rigveda (c.1700-1000 BCE) mentions female poets called brahmavadinis, specifically Lopamudra and Ghosha. By 800 BCE women such as Gargi and Maitreyi were mentioned as scholars in the religious Upnishads. Maya, mother of the historic Buddha, was an educated queen while other women in India contributed to writing of the Pali canon. Out of the composers of the Sangam literature 154 were women. However, the education and society of the era continued to be dominated by educated male population.

Early Common Era—High Middle Ages 
Chinese scholars such as Xuanzang and Yi Jing arrived on Indian institutions of learning to survey Buddhist texts. Yi Jing additionally noted the arrival of 56 scholars from India, Japan, and Korea. However, the Buddhist institutions of learning were slowly giving way to a resurgent tradition of Brahmanism during that era. Scholars from India also journeyed to China to translate Buddhist texts. During the 10th century a monk named Dharmadeva from Nalanda journeyed to China and translated a number of texts. Another centre at Vikramshila maintained close relations with Tibet. The Buddhist teacher Atisa was the head monk in Vikramshila before his journey to Tibet.

Examples of royal patronage include construction of buildings under the Rastrakuta dynasty in 945 CE. The institutions arranged for multiple residences for educators as well as state sponsored education and arrangements for students and scholars. Similar arrangements were made by the Chola dynasty in 1024 CE, which provided state support to selected students in educational establishments. Temple schools from 12–13th centuries included the school at the Nataraja temple situated at Chidambaram which employed 20 librarians, out of whom 8 were copiers of manuscripts and 2 were employed for verification of the copied manuscripts. The remaining staff conducted other duties, including preservation and maintained of reference material.

Another establishment during this period is the Uddandapura institute established during the 8th century under the patronage of the Pala dynasty. The institution developed ties with Tibet and became a centre of Tantric Buddhism. During the 10–11th centuries the number of monks reached a thousand, equaling the strength of monks at the sacred Mahabodhi complex. By the time of the arrival of the Islamic scholar Al Biruni India already had an established system of science and technology in place. Also by the 12th century, invasions from India's northern borders disrupted traditional education systems as foreign armies raided educational institutes, among other establishments.

Late Middle Ages—Early Modern Era

With the advent of Islam in India the traditional methods of education increasingly came under Islamic influence. Pre-Mughal rulers such as Qutb-ud-din Aybak and other Muslim rulers initiated institutions which imparted religious knowledge. Scholars such as Nizamuddin Auliya and Moinuddin Chishti became prominent educators and established Islamic monasteries. Students from Bukhara and Afghanistan visited India to study humanities and science.

Islamic institution of education in India included traditional madrassas and maktabs which taught grammar, philosophy, mathematics, and law influenced by the Greek traditions inherited by Persia and the Middle East before Islam spread from these regions into India. A feature of this traditional Islamic education was its emphasis on the connection between science and humanities. Among the centres of education in India was 18th century Delhi was the Madrasah-i Rahimiyah under the supervision of Shah Waliullah, an educator who favored an approach balancing the Islamic scriptures and science. The course at the Madrasa Rahimiya prescribed two books on grammar, one on philosophy, two on logic, two on astronomy and mathematics, and five on mysticism. Another centre of prominence arose in Lucknow under Mulla Nizamuddin Sahlawi, who educated at the Firangi Mahal and prescribed a course called the Dars-i-Nizami which combined traditional studies with modern and laid emphasis on logic.

The education system under the rule of Akbar adopted an inclusive approach with the monarch favoring additional courses: medicine, agriculture, geography, and texts from other languages and religions, such as Patanjali's work in Sanskrit. The traditional science in this period was influenced by the ideas of Aristotle, Bhāskara II, Charaka and Ibn Sina. This inclusive approach was not uncommon in Mughal India. The more conservative monarch Aurangzeb also favored teaching of subjects which could be applied to administration. The Mughals, in fact, adopted a liberal approach to sciences  and as contact with Persia increased the more intolerant Ottoman school of manqul education came to be gradually substituted by the more relaxed maqul school.

The Middle Ages also saw the rise of private tuition in India as state failed to invest in public education system. A tutor, or riyazi, was an educated professional who could earn a suitable living by performing tasks such as creating calendars or generating revenue estimates for nobility. Another trend in this era is the mobility among professions, exemplified by Qaim Khan, a prince famous for his mastery in crafting leather shoes and forging cannons.

François Bernier, a French physician, would spend 12 years in India, from 1658, serving Shah Jahan's sons, Dara Shikoh, and Aurangzeb. During his time he travelled with the Mughal court, and complied a series of observations on the structure and state of education in the empire, which he would publish in France, under the title Travels in the Mogul Empire, in 1670. His critique identified the lack of any formal higher education institutions, other than small groups of disciples under religious gurus, who would be housed in the homes of rich merchants. The disciples spending up to a decade studying little more than Sanskrit scripture, astronomy, a taught mythical geographical model, of a flat triangular earth, supported on the backs of elephants, and medicine without the study of anatomy or dissection, with a taught assertion of human bodies containing 5000 veins.

Traditional schools
Male education in India commenced under the supervision of a guru in traditional schools called gurukuls. The gurukuls were supported by public donation and were one of the earliest forms of public school offices. However these Gurukuls catered only to the Upper castes of the Indian society and the overwhelming masses were denied any formal education.

Austrian missionary, linguist, and orientalist Paulinus of St. Bartholomew, would spend 13 years travelling the Malabar Coast of Hyder Ali's Kingdom of Mysore, from 1776. Compiling and later publishing the first European grammar of the Sanskrit, pointing out similarities between Sanskrit and other Indo-European languages, and a critique of education in the Kingdom, noting:

A near identical system was observed, described, and enumerated in Adam's 1836 report on vernacular education in Bengal and Bihar; of village schools offering respectable boys between 5-6 years and 10-12 years of age, instruction under a respectable guru, in or near his home, for a small fee. A system of instruction local artists, in the 1850s, were still illustrating. 

Indigenous education was given higher importance from early time to colonial era.

Colonial era
The Jesuits introduced India to both the European college system and the printing of books, through founding Saint Paul's College, Goa in 1542. The French traveler François Pyrard de Laval, who visited Goa c. 1608, described the College of St Paul, praising the variety of the subjects taught there free of charge. Like many other European travelers who visited the college, he recorded that at this time it had 3,000 students, from all the missions of Asia. Its library was one of the biggest in Asia, and the first printing press was mounted there, in September 1556.

British India

In 19th century India, "English education" meant "modern education". Most taught a curriculum similar to public schools. Britain at the time through English as a medium of instruction, especially those sponsored by missionaries. Some taught the curriculum through vernacular languages with English as a second language. The term "pre-modern" was used for three kinds of schools. The Arabic and Sanskrit schools taught Muslim or Hindu sacred literature, while the Persian schools taught Persian literature. The vernacular schools across India taught reading and writing the vernacular language and arithmetic.

As a result of decades of lobbying by the likes of William Wilberforce, and Charles Grant, the 1813 renewal of East India Company's charter carried a duty to educate, and assist previously excluded Christian missionaries to educate the population, in addition to the Company's corporate activities. The Company's officers were divided as to how to implement this imposed duty, with the orientalists, who believed that education should happen in Indian languages (of which they favored classical or court languages like Sanskrit or Persian), while the utilitarians (also called anglicists) like Lord William Bentinck, and Thomas Macaulay, strongly believed that traditional India had nothing to teach regarding modern skills; the best education for them would happen in English. Macaulay called for an educational system - now known as Macaulayism - that would create a class of anglicised Indians who would serve as cultural intermediaries between the British and the Indians.

Early 19th-century surveys 
According to Sir Thomas Munro's Minutes on Native Education, in 1822 and 1826, the Madras Presidency had 11,758 schools, and 740 centers for higher education in the Presidency, and with the exception of a few European missionary schools were funded and managed at a community level. The number of students was recorded as 161,667, with 157,644 boys, and 4,023 girls, or approximately 1 in 6 boys of school-age, which was better than the 1 in 8 boys identified by a similar exercise in the Bombay Presidency. According to the Adam's enquiry, around 1835 there existed approximately 100,000 village schools in the  Bengal Presidency, offering an education to 13.2% of boys. Though the standard of instruction was criticized as rudimentary, well below European standards, and cultivating little more than memory. 

Munro's 1826 critique also covered the funding, and teacher quality in the traditional system, with a claim that due to the average teacher earning no more than 6 or 7 Rupees monthly, from fees of 4 to 8 Annas per pupil, the calibre of the teachers was wanting, before suggesting the East India Company (EIC) fund both the construction of new schools, textbooks, and offer a 9 to 15 Rupee stipend to the teachers in the new schools, to supplement their incomes derived from tuition fees, in the Madras Presidency. After the introduction of Western-style education, the numbers of these indigenous educational institutions began to drastically decline.

In the Punjab Province, Dr Leitner, the Principal of the Oriental College and Government College, Lahore, estimated that in 1855-1856, six years after the province was annexed by the East India Company, there were at least five thousand indigenous schools operating, and assuming 6 pupils per indigenous school the total number of pupils was approximately thirty thousand, while there were 456 Government supported schools, of approximately 13 pupils per school, instructing a further six thousand and sixty four pupils, in the region that hosted 17.6 million. Leither goes in to criticize the Provincial Government for subsidising the education of pupils, in the Government supported schools, at Rs 15 per year, when the Indigenous schools only chargred one Rs per pupil.

Reform 
British education became solidified into India as missionary schools were established during the 1820s.

Macaulay succeeded in replacing Persian with English, as the administrative language, the use of English as the medium of instruction, and the training of English-speaking Indians as teachers, through the English Education Act 1835. He was inspired by utilitarian ideas and called for "useful learning."

In 1854 the Wood's despatch to the then Governor General Dalhousie stipulated a number of reforms be made to the Companies Education system, in British India.

The effectiveness of the measures stipulated in the Wood's despatch were subsequently reviewed and a number of subsequent changes made following the publication of William Hunter's Report of the Indian Education Commission 1882, in 1883

Universities

India established a dense educational network (very largely for males) with a Western curriculum based on instruction in English. To further advance their careers many ambitious upper-class men with money, including Gandhi, Nehru and Muhammad Ali Jinnah went to England, especially to obtain a legal education at the Inns of Court.  By 1890 some 60,000 Indians had matriculated, chiefly in the liberal arts or law. About a third entered public administration, and another third became lawyers. The result was a very well educated professional state bureaucracy. By 1887 of 21,000 mid-level civil service appointments, 45% were held by Hindus, 7% by Muslims, 19% by Eurasians (one European parent and one Indian), and 29% by Europeans. Of the 1000 top -level positions, almost all were held by Britons, typically with an Oxbridge degree. Today also the same old syllabus is followed in India which was introduced by the Indian National Congress.

The Raj, often working with local philanthropists, opened 186 colleges and universities. Starting with 600 students scattered across 4 universities and 67 colleges in 1882, the system expanded rapidly. More exactly, there never was a "system" under the Raj, as each state acted independently and funded schools for Indians from mostly private sources. By 1901 there were 5 universities and 145 colleges, with 18,000 students (almost all male).  The curriculum was Western. By 1922 most schools were under the control of elected provincial authorities, with little role for the national government. In 1922 there were 14 universities and 167 colleges, with 46,000 students. In 1947, 21 universities and 496 colleges were in operation.  Universities at first did no teaching or research; they only conducted examinations and gave out degrees.

The Madras Medical College opened in 1835, and admitted women so that they could treat the female population who traditionally shied away from medical treatments under qualified male professionals. The concept of educated women among medical professionals gained popularity during the late 19th century and by 1894, the Women's Christian Medical College, an exclusive medical school for women, was established in Ludhiana in Punjab.

The British established the Government College University in Lahore, of present-day Pakistan in 1864. The institution was initially affiliated with the University of Calcutta for examination. The prestigious University of the Punjab, also in Lahore, was the fourth university established by the colonials in South Asia, in the year 1882.

Muhammadan Anglo-Oriental College, founded in 1875, was the first modern institution of higher education for Muslims in India. By 1920 it became The Aligarh Muslim University and was the leading intellectual center of Muslim political activity. The original goals were to train Muslims for British service and prepare an elite that would attend universities in Britain. After 1920 it became a centre of political activism. Before 1939, the faculty and students supported an all-India nationalist movement. However, when the Second World War began political sentiment shifted toward demands for a Muslim separatist movement. The intellectual support it provided proved significant in the success of Jinnah and the Muslim League.

At the 21st Conference of the Indian National Congress in Benares in December 1905, Madan Mohan Malaviya publicly announced his intent to establish a university in Varanasi. On 22 November 1911, he registered the Hindu University Society to gather support and raise funds for building the university. Malaviya sought and received early support from the Kashi Naresh Prabhu Narayan Singh, Thakur Jadunath Singh of Arkha and Rameshwar Singh Bahadur of Raj Darbhanga. BHU Banaras Hindu University was finally established in 1916, the first university in India that was the result of a private individual's efforts.

Amongst the Universities founded in the period are the: University of Bombay 1857, University of Calcutta 1857, University of Madras 1857, University of the Punjab 1882, Allahabad University 1887, University of Mysore 1916, Patna University 1917, Osmania University 1918, Rangoon University 1920, University of Lucknow 1921, University of Dhaka 1921, University of Delhi 1922, Nagpur University 1923, Andhra University 1926, Agra University 1927, Annamalai University 1929, University of Kerala 1937, Utkal University 1943, Panjab University 1947, University of Rajputana 1947

Engineering
The East India Company in 1806 set up Haileybury College in England to train administrators. In India, there were four colleges of civil engineering; the first was Thomason College (Now IIT Roorkee), founded in 1847. The second was Bengal Engineering College (now Indian Institute of Engineering, Science and Technology, IIEST). Their role was to provide civil engineers for the Indian Public Works Department. Both in Britain and in India, the administration and management of science, technical and engineering education was undertaken by officers from the Royal Engineers and the Indian Army equivalent, (commonly referred to as sapper officers). This trend in civil/military relationships continued with the establishment of the Royal Indian Engineering College (also known as Cooper's Hill College) in 1870, specifically to train civil engineers in England for duties with the Indian Public Works Department. The Indian Public Works Department, although technically a civilian organisation, relied on military engineers until 1947 and after.

Growing awareness for the need of technical education in India gave rise to establishment of institutions such as the Indian Institute of Science, established by philanthropist Jamshetji Tata in 1909. In 1919 Banaras Hindu University Founded the Banaras Engineering College, it became the Institute of Technology, Banaras Hindu University in 1968, It was designated an Indian Institute of Technology in 2012. By the 1930s India had 10 institutions offering engineering courses. However, with the advent of the Second World War in 1939 the "War Technicians Training Scheme" under Ernest Bevin was initiated, thereby laying the foundation of modern technical education in India. Later, planned development of scientific education under Ardeshir Dalal was initiated in 1944.

Criticism 
In 1919, president of the Indian National Congress (INC) C. Sankaran Nair criticised the colonial education system:

Robert Eric Frykenberg examines the 1784 to 1854 period to argue that the colonial education system helped integrate the diverse elements Indian society, thereby creating a new common bond from among conflicting loyalties. The native elite demanded modern education. The University of Madras, founded in 1857, became the single most important recruiting ground for generations of ever more highly trained officials. This exclusive and select leadership was almost entirely "clean-caste" and mainly Brahman. It held sway in both the imperial administration and within princely governments to the south. The position of this mandarin class was never seriously challenged until well into the twentieth century.

Catriona Ellis argues that historians of Indian education have generally confined their arguments to very narrow themes linked to colonial dominance and education as a means of control, resistance, and dialogue. Ellis emphasizes the need to evaluate the education actually experienced by most Indian children, which was  outside the classroom. Public education expenditures varied dramatically across regions with the western and southern provinces spending three to four times as much as the eastern provinces. The reason involved historical differences in land taxes. However the rates of attendance and literacy were not nearly as skewed.

Bihar and Bengal villages
Sociologist, Hetukar Jha, argued that local schools for pre-adolescent children were in a flourishing state in thousands of villages of Bihar and Bengal until the early decades of the nineteenth century. They were village institutions, maintained by village elders with local funds, where their children (from all caste clusters and communities) could, if the father wished, receive useful skills. However, British colonial policies in respect of education and land control adversely affected both the village structure and the village institutions of secular education. The colonial legal system and the rise of caste consciousness since the second half of the nineteenth century only accentuated the problem. Gradually, village as the base of secular identity and solidarity became too weak to create and maintain its own institution by the end of the nineteenth century and the traditional system decayed.

Science

Deepak Kumar argues British colonial rule during the 19th century did not take adequate measures to help develop Western science and technology in India and instead focused more on arts and humanities. Till 1899 only the University of Bombay offered a separate degree in sciences. In 1899 B.Sc and M.Sc. courses were also supported by the University of Calcutta.
By the late 19th century India had lagged behind in Western science and technology and related education. However, the nobility and aristocracy in India largely continued to encourage the development of sciences and technical education, both traditional and Western.

While some science related subjects were not allowed in the government curriculum in the 1850s the private institutions could also not follow science courses due to lack of funds required to establish laboratories etc. The fees for scientific education under the British rule were also high. The salary that one would get in the colonial administration was meager and made the prospect of attaining higher education bleak since the native population was not employed for high positions in the colonial setup. Even the natives who did manage to attain higher education faced issues of discrimination in terms of wages and privileges.

Deepak Kumar goes on to argue that the British detachment towards the study of Western science in India is that England itself was gradually outpaced in science and technology by European rival Germany and a fast-growing United States so the prospects of the British Raj adopting a world class science policy towards its colonies increasingly decreased. However, Deepak Kumar notes the British turn to professional education during the 1860s and the French initiatives at raising awareness on science and technology in French colonies.

Native states 

In 1906, the Maharaja of Baroda State introduced measures to implement compulsory primary education in his territory, for both sexes. Schools were built, and parents fined, and occasionally imprisoned for non-attendance, where schools existed. This program tripled the kingdoms literacy, from 9% to 27%, in the 1906-1939 period, and resulted in primary school provision for approximately 80% of target population, by the end of the period.

Post-independence

India 
The first Indian Institutes of Technology were established in the 1950s to promote technical education in India. Now, there are 23 IITs in India that are considered to be the premier engineering universities of the country.

The Sarva Shikhsha Abhiyan is aimed at free and compulsory education as a fundamental right to children between the ages of 6 and 14. The Right to Education Act was passed in 2009.

Pakistan
Pakistan for centuries has had an elaborate network of religious educational institutions, known as madāris or madrasahs. They have been the target of criticism by both political elites and religious scholars for their conservatism and resistance to change.

In the early 1970s President Ali Bhutto imposed a new educational policy which nationalized all private educational institutions and placed greater emphasis upon "agro-technical" education. The Bhutto government established a large number of rural and urban schools, including around 6,500 elementary schools, 900 middle schools, 407 high schools, 51 intermediate colleges and 21 junior colleges. At the top he created Quaid-i-Azam University and the nationwide Allama Iqbal Open University based in Islamabad, and Gomal University Dera Ismail Khan in 1973. Ali Bhutto was himself educated in elite American and British universities.

See also
List of universities in India

Notes

References
 Adam, William. One Teacher, One School: The Adam Reports on Indigenous Education in 19th Century India (Biblia Impex, 1983).
 Aggarwal, D. D. History and Development of Elementary Education in India  (3 vol. New Delhi: Sarup & Sons, 2002) isbn 81-7625-332-4
 Ali, Azra Asghar. "Educational development of Muslim women in colonial India." Journal of the Research Society of Pakistan 36.1 (1999): 56-62.
 
 
 "Founder of Banaras Hindu University: Mahamana Pandit Madan Mohan Malaviya" (PDF). Banarash Hindu University. 2006. p. 30. Retrieved 6 June 2012.
 Blackwell, Fritz (2004), India: A Global Studies Handbook, ABC-CLIO, Inc., .
 Chaudhary, Latika. "Determinants of primary schooling in British India." Journal of Economic History (2009): 269-302 online.
 Dharampal, . (2000). The beautiful tree: Indigenous Indian education in the eighteenth century. Biblia Impex Private Limited, New Delhi 1983; reprinted by Keerthi Publishing House Pvt Ltd., Coimbatore 1995.
 
 Ghosh, Suresh Chandra. The History of Education in Modern India, 1757-2012. (4th ed. Orient Black Swan, 2013), a standard scholarly history.
 Ghosh, Suresh Chandra. "Bentinck, Macaulay and the introduction of English education in India." History of Education 24.1 (1995): 17-24.
 Hamid, M. Obaidul, and Elizabeth J. Erling. "English-in-education policy and planning in Bangladesh: A critical examination." in English language education policy in Asia (Springer, Cham, 2016). 25-48.
 Hartog, Philip. (1939) Some aspects of Indian education past and present online,  an old scholarly history.
 Jayapalan N. (2005) History Of Education In India  excerpt and text search,  a standard scholarly history.
 Khan, Ghazanfar Ali. History of Islamic Education in India and Nadvat Ul-'Ulama (2020) excerpt
 Kumar, Deepak (2003), "India", The Cambridge History of Science vol 4: Eighteenth-Century Science edited by Roy Porter, pp. 669–687, Cambridge University Press, .
 
 Minault, Gail. Secluded Scholars: Women's Education & Muslim Social Reform in Colonial India (1999),  359pp
 
 Mukerji, Shridhar Nath. History of education in India: modern period (1961) online,  a standard scholarly history.
 Nurullah, Syed, and  J. P. Naik. A Students' History of Education In India (1800-1961)  (2nd ed. 1962), an old scholarly history. online
 Prabhu, Joseph (2006), "Educational Institutions and Philosophies, Traditional and Modern", Encyclopedia of India (vol. 2) edited by Stanley Wolpert, pp. 23–28, Thomson Gale, .
 Raman, S.A. (2006), "Women's Education", Encyclopedia of India (vol. 4) edited by Stanley Wolpert, pp. 235–239, Thomson Gale, .
  

 Sarangapani, Padma M., and Rekha Pappu, eds. Handbook of Education Systems in South Asia (Springer Singapore, 2019).
 Savage, David W. "Missionaries and the development of a colonial ideology of female education in India." Gender & History 9.2 (1997): 201-221.
 Scharfe, Hartmut (2002), Education in Ancient India, (Brill Academic Publishers)
 Sen, Bimal (1989), "Development of Technical Education in India and State Policy-A Historical Perspective", Indian Journal of History of Science, 24#2 pp: 224–248, Indian National Science Academy.
 Sen, S.N. (1988), "Education in Ancient and Medieval India", Indian Journal of History of Science, 23#1 pp: 1-32, Indian National Science Academy.
 Sharma, Ram Nath. (1996) History of education in India excerpt and text search,  a standard scholarly history.
 Sharma, S.R. History & Development of Education in Modern India (2010),  a standard scholarly history.
 Spear, Percival. "Bentinck and Education." Cambridge Historical Journal 6#1 (1938): 78-101. online debates in 1834.
 Swarup, Ram (2000). "Educational System During Pre-British Days" In: On Hinduism: Reviews and reflections. New Delhi: Voice of India.

History of education in Asia

 
South Asian culture

ja:インドの教育
te:భారతదేశంలో విద్య
zh:印度教育